Looking for Anne of Green Gables: The Story of L. M. Montgomery and her Literary Classic is a dual biography of Anne Shirley and her creator L. M. Montgomery. Anne of Green Gables is a 1908 children's novel which has been read by over fifty million readers and translated into over thirty-five languages. The author reconstructs the development of Anne Shirley, the main character in Montgomery's novel.

The book is researched and written by biographer Irene Gammel.

Publisher
 Canada: Key Porter. 
 US: St.Martin's Press.

References

External links 
 Anne of Green Gables Centenary – this site includes information about the centenary anniversary of Lucy Maud Montgomery's Anne of Green Gables.

Canadian biographies
2008 non-fiction books